Hrdlička (feminine Hrdličková) is a Czech surname. Notable people with the surname include:

Aleš Hrdlička (1869–1943), Czech-American anthropologist
Alfred Hrdlicka (1928–2009), Austrian sculptor, draughtsman, painter
Franz Hrdlicka (1920–1945), German Luftwaffe pilot
Ivan Hrdlička (born 1943), Slovak football player
Jayne Hrdlicka, managing director and chief executive in Australia
Karolína Plíšková Hrdličková, Czech tennis player
Květa Hrdličková Peschke, Czech tennis player
Libor Hrdlička, Slovak football player
Petr Hrdlička (born 1967), Czech sports shooter
Tomáš Hrdlička (born 1982), Czech football player

See also
 
Roberto Herlitzka (born 1937), Italian film actor

Czech-language surnames